Édouard Aynard (1 January 1837, Lyon - 25 January 1913) was a French politician belonging to the Republican Federation. He was a member of the Chamber of Deputies from 1889 to 1913.

References

1837 births
1913 deaths
Politicians from Lyon
Progressive Republicans (France)
Republican Federation politicians
Members of the 5th Chamber of Deputies of the French Third Republic
Members of the 6th Chamber of Deputies of the French Third Republic
Members of the 7th Chamber of Deputies of the French Third Republic
Members of the 8th Chamber of Deputies of the French Third Republic
Members of the 9th Chamber of Deputies of the French Third Republic
Members of the 10th Chamber of Deputies of the French Third Republic
Regents of the Banque de France